Gheorghe Șalaru (born 11 November 1961) is a Moldovan politician. He was the Environment Minister in the First Vlad Filat Cabinet and in the Second Filat Cabinet.

Biography 

He is a member of the Liberal Party (PL).

References

External links  

 Government of Moldova
 

1961 births
Romanian people of Moldovan descent
Living people
People from Cimișlia District
20th-century Moldovan historians
Liberal Party (Moldova) politicians
Moldova State University alumni